Galal Mostafa Mohamed Saeed ( is an Egyptian engineer and politician. He is a former governor of Cairo.

Early life and education
Dr. Galal Saeed graduated as a civil engineer in 1971 from the Faculty of Engineering, Cairo University. He received a master's degree from the same university before he traveled to Canada to complete his postgraduate studies. In Canada, he earned a master's degree in the field of transportation and traffic engineering from McMaster University in Canada. In 1979, he received a doctorate from the University of Waterloo in Canada in the field of strategic planning for transportation. Dr. Galal Saeed began his career as a teaching assistant before getting a doctorate and becoming a professor. He studied and lectured in many universities like Waterloo, Cairo University and Kuwait University.

Career
 Dean of the Faculty of Engineering from 1992 to 2001, Cairo University
 President of Fayoum University
 Governor of Fayoum
 Minister of Transportation during the Cabinet of Kamal Ganzouri (was a candidate for the same post in Hazem El-Beblawi's government)

References

Egyptian engineers
Egyptian politicians